Kevin Lamar McCall Jr. (born July 25, 1985) is an American singer, songwriter, and record producer. He is best known for his association with fellow singer Chris Brown. McCall signed to Brown in a joint venture with RCA Records in 2012. He was featured on Brown's single the same year "Strip", which peaked at number 37 on the Billboard Hot 100. He left the label in 2014 and is currently an independent artist.

Early life 
Kevin Lamar McCall Jr. was born in Los Angeles, California, on July 25, 1985. He has three sisters. He went to high school in Carson, California. Though he played football through most of his childhood and in college at Washington State University, he always had interest in music. Kevin started singing in the church choir, and later taught himself to play piano.

Personal life 
McCall has two daughters, including one with model Eva Marcille.

McCall was arrested at a courthouse in Fulton County, Georgia, in November 2019 after tussling with police before a custody hearing over his and Eva Marcille's daughter, who was five years old at the time. McCall allegedly entered the Justice Center in downtown Atlanta and began using profanity at police officers after security told him he was not allowed to enter. He was subsequently charged with four misdemeanors — obstruction of a law enforcement officer, terroristic threats, disorderly conduct and simple assault — as well as one felony count for second-degree criminal damage to property.

Discography

Albums 
Sincerely, Kevin (2018)

EPs

Mixtapes

Singles

As lead artist

As featured artist

Production and writing credits

Awards and nominations 
2011, Best Rap/Song Collaboration: "Deuces" (nominated for a Grammy Award)

References

External links 

Living people
African-American record producers
African-American male singer-songwriters
American male composers
American male pianists
Record producers from California
Musicians from Los Angeles
1985 births
Singers from Los Angeles
21st-century African-American male singers
21st-century American male musicians
20th-century American people